Ganado High School is a public high school located in Ganado, Texas (USA) and classified as a 2A school by the UIL.   It is part of the Ganado Independent School District located in east central Jackson County.  In 2015, the school was rated "Met Standard" by the Texas Education Agency.

Athletics
The Ganado Indians compete in these sports 

Cross Country, Volleyball, Football, Basketball, Powerlifting, Golf, Track, Softball & Baseball

State Titles
Girls Golf 
1979(1A), 1981(2A), 1982(2A)
Boys Track 
1980(1A)

References

External links
 
 Ganado ISD

Schools in Jackson County, Texas
Public high schools in Texas